Kolgaon may refer to the following places:

Kolgaon, Haryana, a village
Kolgaon, Maharashtra, a village